Hyde Park Blues was an early twentieth century U.S. soccer team.  Hyde Park Blues were an ethnic British team which played in Chicago's Association Football League before moving to the Chicago Soccer League.

History
In 1904, Hyde Park Blues were an inaugural member of the newly established Chicago Association Football League, a predominantly ethnic British league in Chicago, Illinois.  They won the spring season, edging out Pullman F.C. In the fall 1904 season, they finished 9-0-1, taking the league title for a second consecutive time.  They had their greatest success between 1910 and 1913.  During those years, they won two league championships, one Peel Cup and one league cup (Jackson Cup).  They finished at the bottom of the standings in 1915-1916 and disappeared from view.

Year-by-year

Honors
Peel Cup
 Winner (1):  1911
 Runner Up (1): 1913

Jackson Cup
 Winner (1): 1911

League Championship
 Winner (2): 1911, 1913

References

External links
 "Soccer" Encyclopedia of Chicago
 Chicago Soccer History

Defunct soccer clubs in Illinois
Soccer clubs in Chicago